The men's discus throw event at the 1990 World Junior Championships in Athletics was held in Plovdiv, Bulgaria, at Deveti Septemvri Stadium on 8 and 9 August.  A 2 kg (senior implement) discus was used.

Medalists

Results

Final
9 August

Qualifications
8 Aug

Group A

Participation
According to an unofficial count, 21 athletes from 17 countries participated in the event.

References

Discus throw
Discus throw at the World Athletics U20 Championships